AMATPS is an Operations Support System developed during the early 1980s by the Bell System and Bell Communications Research.  AMATPS is an acronym that stands for Automatic Message Accounting Tele-Processing System.  The purpose of this OSS and communications application was to transport customer billing information from switching systems to a centralized computer that serves as a repository for billing data.  Nearly all wireline and wireless telecommunications companies utilize similar technologies today to transport near-real-time billing information.

Early systems deployed in the mid-1970s include HOBIC or Hotel Billing Information Center features deployed with Traffic Service Position System TSPS switching systems used for operator-assisted calls.  HOBIC provided near-real-time billing to hotels for calls initiated by their guests.

References
Bell System Technical Journal published in 1975.

 

Telecommunications standards